Barbora Krejčíková and Kateřina Siniaková defeated Gabriela Dabrowski and Demi Schuurs in the final, 6–4, 6–3 to win the women's doubles tennis title at the 2021 Madrid Open. It marked the duo's seventh career WTA Tour doubles title together, as well as Krejčíková's eighth individual doubles title and Siniaková's 10th.

Hsieh Su-wei and Barbora Strýcová were the reigning champions from when the tournament was last held in 2019, but Strýcová did not return to compete due to her pregnancy. Hsieh partnered Elise Mertens; they lost in the second round to Jeļena Ostapenko and Anastasia Pavlyuchenkova. Despite the loss, Mertens usurped Hsieh for the WTA No. 1 doubles ranking.

Seeds

Draw

Finals

Top half

Bottom half

WTA doubles main draw entrants

Seeds

Rankings are as of April 26, 2021.

Other entrants
The following pairs received wildcards into the doubles main draw:
  Paula Badosa /  Sara Sorribes Tormo
  Aliona Bolsova /  Danka Kovinić

The following pair received entry into the doubles main draw using a protected ranking:
  Oksana Kalashnikova /  Alla Kudryavtseva
  Makoto Ninomiya /  Yaroslava Shvedova
  Elena Vesnina /  Vera Zvonareva

The following pair received entry into the doubles draw as an alternate:
  Paula Kania-Choduń /  Katarzyna Piter
  Petra Martić /  Shelby Rogers

Withdrawals
Before the tournament
  Tímea Babos /  Veronika Kudermetova → replaced by  Veronika Kudermetova /  Anastasia Potapova
  Ashleigh Barty /  Jennifer Brady → replaced by  Nao Hibino /  Renata Voráčová
  Aliona Bolsova /  Danka Kovinić → replaced by  Paula Kania-Choduń /  Katarzyna Piter
  Anna Kalinskaya /  Viktória Kužmová → replaced by  Ekaterina Alexandrova /  Yang Zhaoxuan
  Asia Muhammad /  Jessica Pegula → replaced by  Kaitlyn Christian /  Sabrina Santamaria
  Elena Rybakina /  Maria Sakkari → replaced by  Petra Martić /  Shelby Rogers

During the tournament
  Victoria Azarenka /  Ons Jabeur

References

External Links
Main Draw

2021 WTA Tour
Women's Doubles